DePaul College (SVDPC) is located in Eluru, West Godavari district, Andhra Pradesh, India. It is affiliated with Andhra University. The college derives its title and inspiration from St. Vincent de Paul, the patron saint of the Vincentian Congregation, a missionary religious community which manages the college.

External links
Higher Education in India: DePaul College

Vincentian schools
Christian universities and colleges in India
Universities and colleges in West Godavari district
Education in Eluru
Educational institutions established in 1990
Colleges affiliated to Andhra University
Christian schools in Andhra Pradesh
1990 establishments in Andhra Pradesh